Matt O'Sullivan (born 1978) is an Australian senator.

Matthew or Matt O'Sullivan may also refer to:

Sportspeople
Matt O'Sullivan (soccer), retired American soccer player
Matthew O'Sullivan (soccer), see All-time Bakersfield Brigade roster

Other people
Matthew O'Sullivan (voice actor), in Ultraman: Towards the Future

See also
Matthew Sullivan (disambiguation)